Prayer of Death is the third studio album by the band Entrance. It is the band's first release on Tee Pee Records. It was released in October 2006.

Track listing 
 All songs were written by Guy Blakeslee

"Grim Reaper Blues" - 4:29
"Silence on a Crowded Train" - 4:16
"Requiem for Sandy Bull (R.I.P.)" - 2:40
"Valium Blues" - 5:24
"Pretty Baby" - 6:38
"Prayer of Death" - 4:42
"Lost in the Dark" - 8:30
"Never Be Afraid!" - 3:47

Personnel 
Guy Blakeslee - Vocals, songwriter, guitar, producer
Paz Lenchantin - Violin, bass guitar, vocals, producer
Derek James - Drums, percussion

References 

2006 albums
Tee Pee Records albums